Viduthalai Chiruthaigal Katchi (VCK) formerly known as the Dalit Panthers of India or the Dalit Panthers Iyyakkam (DPI) is an Indian social movement and political party that seeks to combat caste based discrimination, active in the state of Tamil Nadu. The party also has a strong emphasis on Tamil nationalism. Its chairman is Thol. Thirumavalavan, a lawyer from Chennai and its general secretary is the writer Ravikumar.

History 
The Dalit Panthers Iyyakkam was formed in 1982 in Madurai, Tamil Nadu. The group was found to seek protection of Dalits from the caste atrocities. Founded by a group of disaffected Dalits under the leadership of M. Malalchami, it emerged as a loosely organised group of local activists seeking assistance and protection through the association of a larger movement. The movement was inspired by the Dalit Panthers of India, a social movement which itself had formed earlier in the 1970s in Maharashtra which itself was inspired by the Black Panther Party, a socialist movement that sought to combat racial discrimination in the United States.

In 1989, after the death of the founder of Dalit Panthers of India (DPI), Thirumavalavan became its leader. In the 1990s the party grew by highlighting discrimination and caste-based violence. In 1999, VCK contested elections for the first time.

VCK was allotted different election symbols in every election. In 2014, Madras HC ordered the Election Commission of India to consider VCK's request for star as their election symbol.

Party principles 
The main aim of the party is to abolish the differences among Tamil people and to lift up the socio-economically weaker sections of society. The party supported the freedom movement of Tamil people in Tamil Eelam, as well as the security of Tamil people living abroad. The party also declared that Mahinda Rajapaksa should be charged with war crimes for the alleged assassination of thousands of innocent Tamil people during war against the Liberation Tigers of Tamil Eelam. In the Parliament of India in May 2012, Thirumavalavan joined other leaders and raised issue of the Ambedkar cartoon, sparking a controversy in Parliament.

Ahead of the 2016 Tamil Nadu Assembly elections, Thirumavalavan stated his willingness to form a coalition with any party apart from the DMK, AIADMK, BJP and PMK.

Tamil Eelam 
VCK formed Tamil Eelam Supporters Organization (TESO) along with DMK, DK, NTK, and demonstrated protests demanding credential probe into war time crimes against the Sri Lankan government during the war between LTTE and the Sri Lankan government. Thousands of innocent Tamil people were brutally tortured and  murdered during the war. Many countries raised complaints against the Sri Lankan government in the United Nations International Criminal Court of Justice. VCK demanded that former Sri Lankan President Rajapakse should be charged with war crimes. Many of its party men were arrested by Tamil Nadu police for creating public discomfort during protests against the Sri Lankan government. The party is heavily criticised for supporting LTTE and its leader Prabakaran, since LTTE is banned in India.

VCK is accused of promoting Tamil nationalism and supporting the banned group Liberation Tigers of Tamil Eelam. Although major Tamil political parties DMK and ADMK both are accused for indirectly supporting LTTE, VCK is accused of supporting LTTE leader openly in its party posters. It is alleged that LTTE involved in the assassination of Former Indian prime minister Rajiv Gandhi. VCK Party is demanding release of the Rajiv Gandhi murder accusers along with major Tamil parties like NTK, MDMK, PMK, SMK, AIADMK and DMK. VCK Party also celebrated the birth day of Slain LTTE Leader Prabakaran along with other Tamil parties.

Controversies
In April 2019, members of the RSS affiliated, Hindutva group Hindu Munnani broke an earthen pot, the election symbol of VCK at the village of Ponparappi, Ariyalur block, Tiruchi. The incident happened in front of the Panchayat Office where the Tamil Nadu general election polling was going on which lead to a quarrel. This is said to have resulted a retaliatory violence against the Dalits. The Hindu reported a mob of 100 engaged in violence against the Dalits and at least twenty tiled houses which had the VCK symbol were totally damaged. A. Kathir of Evidence, a rights organisation based in Madurai claimed 13 people were admitted at hospitals, 25 houses were fully damaged and 115 houses were damaged. Tirumavalavan after visiting the area, told the media that the PMK and Hindu Munnani were responsible for the violence. In December 2022, VCK protested at the Manuwadi Hindutva supremacist disrespect and cultural appropriation towards the architect of the secular Indian Constitution, Ambedkar.

Electoral performance

Lok Sabha elections

2009 Lok Sabha Election

2014 Lok Sabha Election

2019 Lok Sabha Election

Tamil Nadu Legislative Assembly elections

2006 assembly election

2011 assembly election

2016 Assembly election

2021 Assembly election

References

External links
Location of VCK party office
Official website of Thirumavalavan 
News coverage: Wikinews India, NDTV, The Hindu
TASMAC Campaign 
Gandhian Principles Propaganda 
TASMAC bandh Political parties want TASMAC shop closed
Against Liquor Tamil Nadu bandh: Normal life not affected as protesters target only liquor shops | India News - Times of India
Against TASMAC Tamil Nadu bandh: Normal life not affected as protesters target only liquor shops | India News - Times of India
Tamil Fishermen issue PMK, VCK too oppose Marine Fisheries BillVCK Calls SL Death Sentence Politically Motivated DecisionPMK, VCK too oppose Marine Fisheries Bill
Tamil Eelam issue ‘Unarmed VCK men to fight for Eelam’Breaking News, Live Election 2022 Results: Assembly Election 2022, Dates, Photos, Polls and Results
People welfare Front People Welfare Front: Latest News, Photos, Videos on People Welfare FrontPeople Welfare Front: Latest News, Photos, Videos on People Welfare Front
Tamil Eelam Supporter's organisation Tamil Eelam Supporters Organization observes Black Day against Rajapaksa's participation at UNGA session | India News - Times of IndiaTamil Eelam Supporters Organisation (TESO): Latest News, Videos and Photos of Tamil Eelam Supporters Organisation (TESO) | Times of India TESO Tamil Eelam Supporters Organisation Conference Resolutions August 12 2012 Chennai Tamil Nadu Sri LankaAboutTamil Eelam Supporters Organisation
Jallikattu Issue 
LTTE Ban controversies 

1982 establishments in Tamil Nadu
Dalit politics
Member parties of the United Progressive Alliance
Political parties established in 1982
Political parties in Tamil Nadu
Tamil nationalism